Big Lake is a  oxbow lake in Holt County, Missouri near Big Lake, Missouri.

It is believed to have formed from the Missouri River sometime before the Lewis and Clark Expedition visited the area in 1804.  It is the largest oxbow lake in the state of Missouri.

Big Lake State Park, a  state park was established on the lake's northeast side in 1932.  The State Park also includes the largest marsh in a state park in Missouri.  The remaining two-thirds of the lake shore is occupied by privately owned cabins and residences. The lake is also known for being very shallow (usually only five feet) in most areas. Residents say you can walk across the lake if you are careful.  The only known major deep spot in the lake is under the railroad trussel at the south side of the lake.  This spot is almost 30 feet deep.  The majority of the lake's fish reside here in winter.

External links
Big Lake State Park page

Bodies of water of Holt County, Missouri
Lakes of Missouri
Oxbow lakes of the United States